Larkinia grandis is a genus of saltwater clams in the family Arcidae, the ark clams.

Description
These shells are white, with 26 ribs and a dark, smooth periostracum.

Distribution
This species is present in the North Pacific Ocean (Mexico, El Salvador, Peru, Gulf of California).

References

Arcidae
Bivalves described in 1829